Locketidium is a genus of East African dwarf spiders that was first described by R. Jocqué in 1981.  it contains only three species, found in Kenya, Malawi, and Tanzania: L. bosmansi, L. couloni, and L. stuarti.

See also
 List of Linyphiidae species (I–P)

References

Araneomorphae genera
Linyphiidae
Spiders of Africa